Ciné+ Émotion is a French television channel belonging to MultiThématiques, subsidiary of Canal+ Group.

Television stations in France
MultiThématiques
Television channels and stations established in 1996